Aljezur  is a town and municipality of the District of Faro and Algarve region, in Portugal. The population in 2011 was 5,884, in an area of 323.50 km². The municipality comprises 4 parishes.

History

Aljezur Do árabe al jazair, plural de al jazira, 'ilha'Aljezur Do árabe al jazair, plural de al jazira, 'ilha'   ...

Aljezur is a land that has distant origins, and is marked by various archeological remnants. Its territory has been inhabited since prehistory. Vestiges from remote pre-history generally attest to the age of the region (as early as 7000 BCE). Nomadic tribes of hunter-gathers, hunted or fished in the region, in addition to scavenging in the lands for tubers or roots, that constituted their basic diet. It was during the Neolithic and Calcolithic (3000-2500 BCE) and Bronze Age (1200-800 NCE) that settlement began to take root. But, the period of Muslim occupation (during the 10th-11th century) resulted in the largest expansion of architectonic construction, as evidenced by archaeological excavations in the Castle of Aljezur, Ponta da Atalaia (Ribat of Arrifana), and Ponta do Castelo (Carrapateira), as well as in Alcaria. A 12th Century fishing village excavated in 2001 gives evidence of an agro-maritime economy with fishing, crop cultivation and animal rearing being carried out.

Politically, Aljezur was founded in the 10th century by Berbers who remained in the region for the following five centuries, until the Christian conquest. They were responsible for many of the structures in the region, such as the main castle, but also for the many names that dotted the region's toponymy, as well as the legends and myths that developed by its peoples.

The village of Aljezur was taken from the Moors in 1249, during the reign of D. Afonso III, by Paio Peres Correia, Master of the Order of Santiago. The Christians gave thanks for their success to the Virign Mary, and in an expansion of faith, Nossa Senhora da Alva (Our Lady of the Dawn) was named patron saint of Aljezur, as a result of the mythical legend of the Conquest of the Castle.

Aljezur obtained a foral (charter) from 12 November 1280, issued by King Denis of Portugal in Estremoz, it was the first charter issued by the king in the Algarve. On 1 June 1504, King Manuel of Portugal reformed the diplomatic map issued by King Denis, and promoted the town with the title Nobre e Honrada (Noble and Honoured).

Following the Restoration War, in the reigns of King Afonso VI and his brother, regent (then King) Peter II, the coastal lands were infested with Moroccan corsairs that anchored in the coastal coves and unprotected anchorages, then attacked and pillaged the local towns. Carrapateira was erected between two beaches, where pirates could easily disembark: Praia da Bordeira (to the north) and Praia do Amado (to the south). From these beaches, pirates targeted local homes, kidnapping many and selling them into slavery in the markets of Algiers. Similarly, in Arrifana, which formed a small cove protected by strong waves and easy access to the sea. Therefore, in the 17th century, they national government  constructed the Fort of Arrifana; erected in 1635, rebuilt in 1635 and 1670, it was originally established to protect a fishing port that existed by 1516.

The Church of Carrapateira, dedicated to Our Lady of the Conception, was constructed during the reign of John IV, sometime around 1673. The place where the church was erected (a hilltop with a view to the sea and settlement) was the ideal place for a church, but also for the construction of the Fort of Carrapateira, by D. Nuno da Cunha de Ataíde, Count of Pontevel and governor. It was there that the temple was erected.

All of Aljezur was gravely damaged by the 1755 earthquake. Bishop Francisco Gomes de Avelar ordered the construction of the Church of Nossa Senhora de Alva in the edge of the town, in order to form a new population center. Its name slowly adapted the name Igreja Nova (New Church).

Geography

Aljezur is located along the western coast of the Algarve, within the Southwest Alentejo and St. Vincent Coast Nature Park: this region, mixes landscapes clifftop landscapes and sea fronts. From the north to south, from Odeceixe to Carrapateira, the municipality is a mixture of many views, marked by archaeological vestiges of elevated interest, museums, windmills, cultural landscapes, histo-cultural circuits and recreational trails and BTT bike trails. The coast is carved by nature, with a coast of  marked by beaches from Odeceixe, until Amado, known for its surfing conditions.

Administratively, the municipality is divided into 4 civil parishes (freguesias):
 Aljezur
 Bordeira
 Odeceixe
 Rogil

Local services
There are regular bus services running south to Lagos and north to Lisbon.

Education
Aljezur is home to both primary and secondary state schools and has an International Secondary School Aljezur International School located in the town parish.

References

External links
Municipality official website

 
Populated places in Faro District
Municipalities of the Algarve
Towns of the Algarve
Municipalities of Faro District